Ye Chenghai (born 15 August 1943) is a Chinese billionaire businessman and former politician, the head of Shenzhen Salubris Pharmaceuticals. He is a Hakka born in Meizhou, Guangdong. He served as Vice Mayor of Shenzhen before quitting politics and entering business.

As of May 2015, his net worth is estimated at US$4.2 billion.

References

1943 births
Billionaires from Guangdong
Living people
Place of birth missing (living people)
Chinese company founders
Pharmaceutical company founders
Businesspeople from Meizhou
Politicians from Meizhou
Political office-holders in Guangdong
Hakka politicians